O Shepherd, Speak! is the tenth novel in Upton Sinclair's Lanny Budd series. First published in 1949, the story covers the period from 1945 to 1946.

Plot

References

1949 American novels
American historical novels
Novels by Upton Sinclair
Fiction set in 1945
Fiction set in 1946
Viking Press books